Above the Law (often abbreviated ATL) is a news website about law, law schools, and the legal profession. Established in 2006, the site is owned and published by Breaking Media.

Influence
The site has been sourced by GQ, The American Lawyer, Forbes, Washingtonian, and Gawker, among others. In 2008, it was listed as one of the ABA Journals "100 Best Web Sites by Lawyers, for Lawyers".

The site began publishing an annual law school ranking in 2013.

Staff
David Lat is the founding editor of Above the Law. As of 2019, Elie Mystal leads the publication, producing regular content along with Staci Zaretsky, Joe Patrice, and Kathryn Rubino, joined by a number of columnists from across the legal landscape.

Controversies
In 2011, Above the Law was sued for $50 million for an erroneous story about a rape to which one of its articles linked.  The suit was ultimately settled out of court.

In 2016, Above the Law received criticism from many publications when its Breaking Media Editor at Large, Elie Mystal, wrote an article suggesting that jury nullification of crimes by blacks against whites could be used by jurors as a form of protest.

References

External links 

Internet properties established in 2006
American legal websites
2006 establishments in the United States